Germán Molina Valdivieso (born 1 January 1943) is a Chilean former minister.

References

External links
 Profile at Annales de la República

1943 births
Living people
20th-century Chilean lawyers
Pontifical Catholic University of Valparaíso alumni
Christian Left (Chile) politicians
Party for Democracy (Chile) politicians
Ambassadors of Chile to the Netherlands